Herbert Percy Horne (1864 in London  – 1916 in Florence, Italy) was an English poet, architect, typographer and designer, art historian and antiquarian. He was an associate of the Rhymers' Club in London. He edited the magazines The Century Guild Hobby Horse and The Hobby Horse for the Century Guild of Artists, which he founded with fellow architect Arthur Heygate Mackmurdo in 1882.

Horne was closely associated with Arthur Symons and Selwyn Image and their mistress Muriel (Edith) Broadbent. Later in life he settled in Florence, restoring a Renaissance palazzo into which he eventually moved. He first visited Italy in 1889 and kept an illustrated journal of his travels and art and architectural research.  His monograph on Sandro Botticelli from 1908 is still recognised as of exceptional quality and thoroughness.

Death and commemoration
He donated his collection, of arts and handicrafts of the 14th and 15th centuries, to create the Museo della Fondazione Horne in Florence, where he died.

He is buried in the Cimitero Evangelico degli Allori in the southern suburb of Florence, Galluzzo (Italy).

Horne founded the Riccardi Press, a leading British private press that beginning in 1909 issued titles for the Medici Society and later under its own imprint.

Selected publications
 Diversi Colores (poems). 1891.
 The Binding of Books. An Essay in the History of Gold-Tooled Bindings. London 1894 
 Giovanni dal Ponte. 1906.
 Alessandro Filipepi, commonly called Sandro Botticelli, painter of Florence. 1908; reprint: Princeton University Press 1981,

References

Rediscovering Herbert Horne: Poet, Architect, Typographer, Art Historian (1880–1920 British Authors Series, No 3), Ian Fletcher
 Edward Chaney and Jane Hall, ‘Herbert Horne’s 1889 Diary of his first Journey to Italy’, The Walpole Society, LXIV (2002), pp. 69–125

Further reading
Codell, Julie. "Chelsea Bohemian: Herbert Percy Horne, the Critic as Artist," Ph.D. dissertation, Indiana University, 1978.
Codell, Julie."Horne's Botticelli: Pre-Raphaelite Modernity, Historiography and the Aesthetic of Intensity," Journal of Pre-Raphaelite and Aesthetic Studies, 2 (1989), 27–41.

1864 births
1916 deaths
English art historians
English typographers and type designers
Architects from London
English magazine editors
English male poets
English male non-fiction writers